The Kitchigama River is a river in the Eeyou Istchee Baie-James, in the administrative region of Nord-du-Québec, in Quebec, in Canada. It is a tributary of the Nottaway River.

This hydrographic slope has no access forest road. The surface of the river is usually frozen from early November to mid-May, however, safe ice circulation is generally from mid-November to mid-April.

Geography 
The Kitchigama River originates at the mouth of Grasset Lake (Eeyou Istchee James Bay) which is located in Grasset Township. It is surrounded by large swamp areas. It receives the waters of the Supercase River on the south side and the waters of two unidentified streams on the east side.

From Grasset Lake (Eeyou Istchee James Bay), the Kitchigama River flows over  according to the following segments:

Upper Kitchigama River (segment of )
 north, to the outlet of Lac La Forest (coming from the North-West);
 northeasterly, to the outlet of Testard and Gabriel lakes (from the southeast);
 northeasterly to the northern limit of La Forest Township;
 northeasterly to Kashapuminatikuch Creek (from the North);
 east to the confluence of the Pahunan River;

Kitchigama River Intermediate Course (segment of )
 north, to the outlet of Lake Montreau (coming from the East);
 northwesterly to the outlet of Kamivakutisi Lake (coming from the West);

Lower Kitchigama River (segment of )
 northwesterly to a bend in the river;
 northwesterly from the northeastern side of a filamentous melt to a bend in the river;
 north to mouth.

This confluence is located at:
 Northwest of the mouth of Matagami Lake;
 North-west of downtown Matagami, Quebec;
 East of the Ontario - Quebec border.

Etymology 
The name Kitchigama would be derived from kitci and kami, meaning large body of water in algonquin.

This name appears in 1896 on the map of Robert Bell. Some explorers of European descent have designated this river "Fall to Gama". According to father Georges Lemoine, the name "Kitchigama" is of Algonquin origin. This term would be derived from "kitci" and "kami", meaning "large body of water". According to Father Joseph-Étienne Guinard, the Crees and the Algonquins the term "Kitchigami" means "the sea, the ocean and all large bodies of water".

In the course of history, several graphic variants have been identified: Kitchigoma, Michagami, Michagimi, Matchigama, Michigama, Mitchagimi, Mitchigami. Recent Cree surveys have identified the toponym "Minikwanaw Shipish", translated as "river of the mountain that drinks". Other Cree appellation of origin identify certain segments of the river, including "Kachiwapaminakuch Sipi", meaning "it can be seen from the river"; and "Nakatewakamiu Sipi, meaning" river with black water".

Notes and references

See also 

Eeyou Istchee Baie-James (municipality), a municipality
Nottaway River, a watercourse
Grasset Lake (Eeyou Istchee James Bay), a lake
Supercase River, a watercourse
Pahunan River, a watercourse
James Bay
List of rivers of Quebec

Rivers of Nord-du-Québec